William Lewis Stoughton (March 20, 1827 – June 6, 1888) was a politician and soldier from U.S. state of Michigan who served in the United States Congress, as well as serving as an officer and brigade commander in the Union Army during the American Civil War.

Biography
Stoughton was born in Bangor, New York.  He attended Kirtland, Painesville, and Madison Academies in Lake County, Ohio.  He studied law in Ohio, Indiana, and Michigan from 1849 to 1851 when he was admitted to the bar and commenced practice in Sturgis, Michigan.

Stoughton was a prosecuting attorney of St. Joseph County from 1855 to 1859 and a delegate to the 1860 Republican National Convention.  He was appointed by President Abraham Lincoln as United States District Attorney for the District of Michigan in March 1861, but resigned a few months later to enter the Union Army following the outbreak of the Civil War.

He served as colonel of the 11th Michigan Infantry. Stoughton commanded the 2nd Brigade, 1st Division of the XIV Corps of the Army of the Cumberland at the Battle of Chattanooga. He resigned in August 1864 because of ill health and resumed the practice of his profession in Sturgis, Michigan, in 1865. On February 28, 1867, President Andrew Johnson nominated Stoughton for appointment to the grade of brevet major general of volunteers, to rank from March 13, 1865, and the United States Senate confirmed the appointment on March 2, 1867.

In 1867, Stoughton became a member of the Michigan State Constitutional convention and served as Michigan Attorney General from 1867 to 1868.  He was elected as a Republican from Michigan's 2nd congressional district to the 41st and 42nd Congresses, serving from March 4, 1869 to March 3, 1873. He returned to the practice of law in 1874.

William L. Stoughton died in Sturgis and was interred in Oak Lawn Cemetery.

See also

11th Michigan Volunteer Infantry Regiment
List of American Civil War brevet generals (Union)

Notes

References
 Retrieved on 2008-10-19
The Political Graveyard
 Eicher, John H., and David J. Eicher, Civil War High Commands. Stanford: Stanford University Press, 2001. .

External links

1827 births
1888 deaths
People from Bangor, New York
Michigan Attorneys General
Union Army colonels
Burials in Michigan
People of Michigan in the American Civil War
Michigan lawyers
People from Lake County, Ohio
People from Sturgis, Michigan
Republican Party members of the United States House of Representatives from Michigan
19th-century American politicians
19th-century American lawyers